On 27 July 2000, de Havilland Canada DHC-6 Twin Otter operated by Royal Nepal Airlines crashed in Nepal en route from Bajhang Airport to Dhangadhi Airport on a domestic passenger flight. The wreckage of the aircraft, registration 9N-ABP, was found in Jogbuda, Dadeldhura District. All 22 passengers and the three crew aboard were killed in the crash. An investigation into the crash was launched by Nepalese authorities after the accident site was located.

Aircraft 
The aircraft involved in the crash was a de Havilland Canada DHC-6 Twin Otter operated by Royal Nepal Airlines. Its maiden flight was in 1979 with Royal Nepal Airlines, who bought the aircraft from manufacturer de Havilland Canada. It was the eighth accident of this aircraft operated by Royal Nepal Airlines, however, it was the twelfth incident involving this type of aircraft in the aviation history of Nepal.

Crew and Passengers 
All occupants on board died in the crash; occupants included the three crew members and 22 passengers, of which three were small children. All occupants were Nepalis.

Incident 
The flight was scheduled for 30 minutes domestic flight from Bajhang Airport, where it left at 10:11 Nepal Standard Time for Dhangadhi Airport in Far-Western Nepal. The last radio contact was made at 10:31, just two minutes before the aircraft was expected to land in Dhangadhi. After a helicopter was deployed to the crash site, it was found that the aircraft had collided with trees on 4,300 feet Jarayakhali Hill of the Sivalik Hills in Jogbuda, Dadeldhura District, where it caught fire.

See also
 List of airplane accidents in Nepal

References 

Aviation accidents and incidents in 2000
Aviation accidents and incidents in Nepal
2000 in Nepal
Accidents and incidents involving the de Havilland Canada DHC-6 Twin Otter
Nepal Airlines accidents and incidents
2000 disasters in Nepal